Gryphius (Latin for griffin) may be

Andreas Gryphius (1616–1664), German lyric poet and dramatist
Christian Gryphius, son of Andreas
Sebastian Gryphius/Sébastien Gryphe (1492–1556), German printer in France